Barry McDonnell (1924 – 14 February 1976) was an Irish rower. He competed in the men's eight event at the 1948 Summer Olympics.

References

External links
 

1924 births
1976 deaths
Irish male rowers
Olympic rowers of Ireland
Rowers at the 1948 Summer Olympics
Place of birth missing